Anton Lutsyk (born 25 March 1987) is a professional Ukrainian football midfielder who currently plays for Ukrainian First League club FC Lviv.

He is the product of the Karpaty Lviv Youth School System.

External links
Statistics at FFU website
Website Karpaty Profile
Profile on EUFO
Profile on Football Squads

1987 births
Living people
Ukrainian footballers
FC Karpaty Lviv players
FC Lviv players
Association football midfielders
Sportspeople from Ivano-Frankivsk